Bálint Károly (born 12 January 1993) is a Hungarian professional footballer who plays for Pécs.

Club career
On 17 June 2021, Károly returned to Pécs. He has been the top goalscorer in the Nemzeti Bajnokság III on two occasions.

Club statistics

Updated to games played as of 10 May 2014.

References

External links

HLSZ 

1993 births
Living people
Sportspeople from Keszthely
Hungarian expatriate footballers
Hungarian footballers
Association football midfielders
Fehérvár FC players
Zalaegerszegi TE players
Puskás Akadémia FC players
Békéscsaba 1912 Előre footballers
FK Csíkszereda Miercurea Ciuc players
Pécsi MFC players
Kecskeméti TE players
Nemzeti Bajnokság I players
Nemzeti Bajnokság II players
Nemzeti Bajnokság III players
Hungarian expatriate sportspeople in Romania
Expatriate footballers in Romania